Wayside stop may refer to:

 Rest area, a designated location alongside a road or highway where motorists can stop and rest
 Railway stop, a small intermediate station on a railway with a platform, but minimal facilities